The Other Guy is an Australian comedy television series which screens on Stan. The series is written by and stars comedian Matt Okine. A second season was released on 13 December 2019.

Synopsis

The series is about a successful radio host who finds himself unexpectedly back in the dating pool for the first time in a decade, after discovering his long-term girlfriend has been having an affair with his best friend.

Cast   
Matt Okine as AJ Amon
Valene Kane as Olivia Collins
Harriet Dyer as Stevie Nicholls
Michael Hing	 as Sam Wu
Michael-Anthony Taylor as Daddy Mack
Christiaan Van Vuuren as Derek aka Dezzy
Luke Ford as Henry

Episodes

Series overview

Season 1 (2017)

Season 2 (2019)

References

External links
 
 

2017 Australian television series debuts
2017 Australian television series endings
English-language television shows
Australian comedy television series
Stan (service) original programming